The Young Social Democrats (MSD) is a social-democratic youth organisation in Czech Republic. While not part of the Czech Social Democratic Party (ČSSD) there is a close relationship between those two organisations.

Historically it builds on legacy of Czechoslovak Social Democratic Youth.

References

External links
Official Website

Youth wings of social democratic parties
Czech Social Democratic Party
1990 establishments in Czechoslovakia
Political parties established in 1990
Youth wings of political parties in the Czech Republic